Witry-lès-Reims (literally Witry near Reims) is a commune in the Marne department in north-eastern France.

Population

See also
Communes of the Marne department

References

Witrylesreims